The Basketball Super League (BSL), also known as the Türkiye Sigorta Basketbol Süper Ligi for sponsorship reasons, is the top men's professional basketball division of the Turkish basketball league system. It replaced the former Turkish Basketball Championship (1946–1966) to become the Turkish Basketball League (TBL) until 2015 when it adopted its current name while the TBL name became exclusive to the second-tier and third-tier divisions.

The BSL is administrated by the Turkish Basketball Federation (TBF) and is contested by 16 teams, with the two lowest-placed teams relegated to the second-tier TBL and replaced by the top two teams of that division. 

Since the league's restructuring in 1966, 11 clubs have been crowned champions, with Anadolu Efes winning the title a record 15 times and Fenerbahçe 10 times. In recent years, Fenerbahçe won 9 titles out of 15 from the 2006–07 season onward.

History
According to official records, basketball was first played in Turkey in 1904 at Robert College. An American physical education teacher laid the foundations of the sport in the country. Seven years later, in 1911, Ahmet Robenson, a physical education teacher at Galatasaray High School, decided to introduce a new game to his students. Robenson, who also later became president of Galatasaray S.K., popularized the sport in Turkey.

Until late 1966, local basketball competitions were held in major cities like Istanbul (which hosted the Istanbul League), Ankara, and İzmir. There was also the former Turkish Championship which existed from 1946 to 1967.

The current Turkish top-tier level national league was founded in 1966, by the Turkish Basketball Federation, and began with the 1966–67 season, and it thus replaced those earlier competitions. The Turkish second-tier level league, the TBL (previously known as the TB2L), was also founded three years later in 1969, and since 2011, a third-tier level league TB2L, with the teams divided into two groups.

Format
There are 16 teams in the league, and they play against each other twice, under a league system format, once at their home and the other away. At the end of the season, the top eight teams are entitled to participate in the league's playoffs. The winners of the playoffs are crowned the Turkish champions. The two top teams of the Turkish Second League are promoted to the top level Basketbol Süper Ligi. The two lowest placed teams of the Süper Ligi are relegated.

Performance by club 
Clubs in bold currently play in the top division.

Current clubs

Title holders 

The winners of the former Turkish Basketball Championship (1946–1967) are not included, only the clubs winning the Basketbol Süper Ligi since its inception in 1966.

 1966–67: Altınordu
 1967–68: İTÜ
 1968–69: Galatasaray
 1969–70: İTÜ
 1970–71: İTÜ
 1971–72: İTÜ
 1972–73: İTÜ
 1973–74: Muhafızgücü
 1974–75: Beşiktaş
 1975–76: Eczacıbaşı
 1976–77: Eczacıbaşı
 1977–78: Eczacıbaşı
 1978–79: Efes Pilsen
 1979–80: Eczacıbaşı
 1980–81: Eczacıbaşı
 1981–82: Eczacıbaşı
 1982–83: Efes Pilsen
 1983–84: Efes Pilsen
 1984–85: Galatasaray

 1985–86: Galatasaray
 1986–87: Karşıyaka
 1987–88: Eczacıbaşı
 1988–89: Eczacıbaşı
 1989–90: Galatasaray
 1990–91: Fenerbahçe
 1991–92: Efes Pilsen
 1992–93: Efes Pilsen
 1993–94: Efes Pilsen
 1994–95: Ülker
 1995–96: Efes Pilsen
 1996–97: Efes Pilsen
 1997–98: Ülker
 1998–99: Tofaş
 1999–00: Tofaş
 2000–01: Ülker
 2001–02: Efes Pilsen
 2002–03: Efes Pilsen
 2003–04: Efes Pilsen

 2004–05: Efes Pilsen
 2005–06: Ülker
 2006–07: Fenerbahçe Ülker
 2007–08: Fenerbahçe Ülker
 2008–09: Efes Pilsen
 2009–10: Fenerbahçe Ülker 
 2010–11: Fenerbahçe Ülker 
 2011–12: Beşiktaş Milangaz
 2012–13: Galatasaray Medical Park
 2013–14: Fenerbahçe Ülker
 2014–15: Pınar Karşıyaka 
 2015–16: Fenerbahçe 
 2016–17: Fenerbahçe
 2017–18: Fenerbahçe Doğuş
 2018–19: Anadolu Efes
 2019–20: Cancelled due to the COVID-19 pandemic.
 2020–21: Anadolu Efes
 2021–22: Fenerbahçe Beko

List of champions

Pre-playoffs era

Playoffs era

Finals MVPs and winner coaches

 There was no awarding in the 2019–20 season, because the season was cancelled due to the coronavirus pandemic in Turkey.

Turkish basketball clubs in European-wide competitions

Awards

Former participants
Note: includes 2022–23 season.

 57 seasons: Fenerbahçe, Galatasaray
 55 seasons: Beşiktaş 
 51 seasons: Karşıyaka
 45 seasons: Anadolu Efes
 39 seasons: Tofaş
 35 seasons: İTÜ
 34 seasons: TED Ankara Kolejliler
 30 seasons: Türk Telekom
 27 seasons: Darüşşafaka
 18 seasons: Eczacıbaşı
 17 seasons: Oyak-Renault
 16 seasons: Ankara DSİ, Bandırma
 15 seasons: Alpella SK/Ülkerspor, Şekerspor
 13 seasons: Muhafızgücü
 11 seasons: Çukurova Sanayi, Gaziantep Basketbol
 9 seasons: Mersin Büyükşehir Belediyespor, Tuborg Pilsener
 8 seasons: Büyükçekmece Basketbol, Yenişehir
 7 seasons: Altınordu, Erdemirspor, Konyaspor, PTT İstanbul, Trabzonspor
 6 seasons: Aliağaspor, Altay, Ankara Ziraat Fakültesi, Antalya Büyükşehir Belediyespor, Beslenspor, Büyük Kolej, Eskişehir Basket, Kadıköyspor, Konyaspor Basket, Ortaköyspor
 5 seasons: Bahçeşehir Koleji, Beykozspor, İnhisar, İstanbul Büyükşehir Belediyespor, Meysuspor, MKE Ankaragücü, Nasaşspor, ODTÜ, Paşabahçe, Taçspor, Uşak Sportif
 4 seasons: Afyon Belediyespor, Antbirlik, Bursaspor, Güney Sanayi
 3 seasons: Antalyaspor, Hilalspor İzmir, Kepez Belediyespor, Modaspor, Petkim Spor, Yeşilgiresun Belediyespor
 2 seasons: Adana Demirspor, Bornova Belediyespor, Göztepe, Hacettepe Üniversitesi, Jandarmagücü, Karagücü, Kurtuluş, Merkezefendi Belediyespor, Muratpaşa Belediyespor, Netaş, OGM Ormanspor, Sakarya Büyükşehir Belediyespor, Yıldırımspor
 1 season: Anadolu Hisarı İdman Yurdu, Bakırköy Basket, Bakırköyspor, Balıkesir BK, Bandırma Kırmızı, Fethiye Belediyespor, Kuşadasıspor, Manisa Büyükşehir Belediyespor, Mülkiye, Samsunspor, Silahlı Kuvvetler Gücü, Tarsus İdman Yurdu, Tekirdağ BK, Yalovaspor BK

See also 
 Men's
 Turkish Men's's Basketball League
 Turkish Men's Basketball Cup
 Turkish Men's Basketball Presidential Cup
 Wome's
Turkish Women's Basketball League
Turkish Women's Basketball Cup
Turkish Women's Basketball Presidential Cup

References

External links 

 Turkish Basketball Federation official website 
 Turkish Basketball Super League official website 
 Turkish league on Eurobasket.com 
 TBLStat.net 

 
1966 establishments in Turkey
Basketball leagues in Europe
Basketball leagues in Turkey
Basketball
Professional sports leagues in Turkey
Sports leagues established in 1966